Problepsis delphiaria is a moth of the  family Geometridae. It is found in south-east Asia, including India, Singapore, Peninsular Malaysia, Burma, Thailand, Sumatra and Borneo.

Subspecies
Problepsis delphiaria delphiaria
Problepsis delphiaria auriculifera Warren, 1897

References

Moths described in 1858
Scopulini
Moths of Asia